Colombia has 11,057 Scouts served by the Asociación Scouts de Colombia. Founded in 1917, it was accepted into the World Organization of the Scout Movement in 1933. The movement is coeducational, accepting both boys and girls.

Scouting first appeared in Colombia in 1913, introduced by Miguel Jimenez, who was living in England at the time. He returned to Colombia and brought Scouting back with him.

Outdoor activities and community service are important parts of the Scout program in Colombia. Scouts participate in national festivals and holidays. They help in sports events, disaster relief and first aid situations. There is also a strong emphasis on conservation and ecology.

Program and ideals
 Manada (Lobatos) - ages 6 to 11
 Tropa (Scouts) - ages 11 to 15
 Comuidad (Caminantes) - ages 15 to 18
 Clan (Rover Scouts) - ages 18 to 25

All sections are coeducational.

The Scout Motto is Siempre Listo, Always Prepared.

The membership badge of Asociación Scouts de Colombia incorporates a shield featuring the flag of Colombia.

Air Scouts
At present only one Air Scout Group - 'Tigres Del Aire' - is known of in Colombia.
The Colombian Air Scouts was created during the administration of  Lieutenant General Gustavo Rojas Pinilla and were then directed in 1957 by Captain Alejandro Garcia; the heads of this group were privileged to study at the school established by the Civil Aviation General Rojas and began a career in commercial aviation.

Scout Oath

Por mi honor y con la gracia de Dios, 
yo prometo hacer todo cuanto de mi dependa, 
para cumplir con mis deberes con Dios y la patria, 
ayudar al prójimo en toda circunstancia 
y cumplir fielmente la Ley Scout.

By my honor and with the grace of God,
I promise to do my best
to fulfill my duties to God and to my country,
to help my fellowman in all circumstances
and to faithfully obey the Scout Law.

See also
 Scouting in Colombia

References

External links
 Official Homepage

World Organization of the Scout Movement member organizations
Scouting and Guiding in Colombia
Youth organizations established in 1917